Joshua Kane Bloxham (born 13 March 1990) is a New Zealand basketball player for the Joondalup Wolves of the NBL1 West. He played 12 seasons in the New Zealand NBL between 2006 and 2020, and was a member of the New Zealand Breakers' 3-peat championship contingent in the Australian NBL between 2010 and 2013.

Early life
Bloxham was born in Christchurch, New Zealand.

NBL career
Bloxham debuted in the New Zealand NBL in 2006 with the Nelson Giants. He played every seasons for the Giants until 2014, including being part of the Giants' 2007 championship team. Between 2010 and 2013, Bloxham was a development player with the New Zealand Breakers of the Australian NBL, where he won three straight championships as a member of the team's 3-peat contingent. He played 27 Australian NBL games.

In 2015 and 2016, Bloxham played for the Super City Rangers in the New Zealand NBL.

In June 2020, Bloxham was acquired by the Nelson Giants for the 2020 season.

In February 2022, Bloxham signed with the Joondalup Wolves for the 2022 NBL1 West season.

National team career
In July 2009, Bloxham played for New Zealand at the FIBA Under-19 World Championship in Auckland.

In August 2011, Bloxham travelled to China for the Summer Universiade to compete with the New Zealand University National Team in the basketball tournament.

In July 2012, Bloxham played for New Zealand at the FIBA World Olympic Qualifying Tournament in Venezuela.

References

External links
FIBA archive profile
fiba.basketball profile

1990 births
Living people
Nelson Giants players
New Zealand men's basketball players
New Zealand Breakers players
People educated at Marlborough Boys' College
People educated at Nelson College
Point guards
Super City Rangers players